Senecio vagus, commonly known as saw groundsel, is a species of flowering plant in the daisy family  Asteraceae. This plant occurs in the Australian states of New South Wales, Victoria and Tasmania. An erect perennial herbaceous plant, growing up to 1.5 metres tall. Mostly seen in moist gullies on the Great Dividing Range. Yellow flowers usually form in spring and summer. The lectotype was collected in the Dandenong Ranges in 1853 by Ferdinand von Mueller.

Subspecies
Two sub-species are accepted;

Senecio vagus subsp. eglandulosus
Senecio vagus subsp. vagus

References

vagus
Asterales of Australia
Flora of New South Wales
Flora of Tasmania
Flora of Victoria (Australia)
Plants described in 1855